The City Municipality of Krško is a city and metropolitan municipality in eastern Slovenia. Its seat is the town of Krško. The area is traditionally divided between Lower Styria (territory on the left bank of the Sava) and Lower Carniola (territory on the right bank of the Sava). The entire municipality is now included in the Lower Sava Statistical Region. Krško received the status of a city municipality in December 2021.

History

Archaeological evidence shows that the area was settled in prehistoric times. Along the Sava River, numerous Bronze and Iron Age sites as well as Roman finds show continuous occupation. After the Medieval period the area was a Habsburg possession. It was affected by Ottoman raids from the 15th to the 17th centuries.

Main sights
Sights in the municipality include the Krško parish church, the Videm-Krško parish church, a church on the right bank of the Sava, a Capuchin monastery, and Krško Castle. Further to the south is Šrajbarski Turn Castle, built in the 16th century. Natural sights in the municipality include Kostanjevica Cave at the foot of the Gorjanci Hills and the Krakovo Forest, the only virgin forest in Slovenia where pedunculate oak (Quercus robur) grows and provides a habitat for several rare and endangered animal species.

Economy
Industries of the City Municipality of Krško include construction, metalworking, paper, textiles, wood processing, agriculture, trade, and transportation, while tourism continues to develop. The fertile flatlands southeast of the town of Krško along the banks of the Sava, known as the Krško-Brežice Plain (Krško - brežiško polje), are used for vineyards as well as apple, pear, peach, apricot, and plum orchards. Local vineyards produce wines such as Cviček, Laški Rizling, and Modra Frankinja, as well as less well-known local wines such as white and red Sremičan and others matured in local wine cellars.

Settlements
In addition to the municipal seat of Krško, the municipality also includes the following settlements:

 Anovec
 Anže
 Apnenik pri Velikem Trnu
 Ardro pod Velikim Trnom
 Ardro pri Raki
 Armeško
 Brege
 Brestanica
 Brezje pri Dovškem
 Brezje pri Raki
 Brezje pri Senušah
 Brezje v Podbočju
 Brezovica v Podbočju
 Brezovska Gora
 Brlog
 Brod v Podbočju
 Bučerca
 Celine
 Cesta
 Cirje
 Črešnjice nad Pijavškim
 Čretež pri Krškem
 Dalce
 Dedni Vrh
 Dobrava ob Krki
 Dobrava pod Rako
 Dobrova
 Dol
 Dolenja Lepa Vas
 Dolenja Vas pri Krškem
 Dolenja Vas pri Raki
 Dolenji Leskovec
 Dolga Raka
 Dovško
 Drenovec pri Leskovcu
 Drnovo
 Dunaj
 Frluga
 Gmajna
 Golek
 Goli Vrh
 Gora
 Gorenja Lepa Vas
 Gorenja Vas pri Leskovcu
 Gorenje Dole
 Gorenji Leskovec
 Gorica
 Gorica pri Raztezu
 Gornje Pijavško
 Gradec
 Gradišče pri Raki
 Gradnje
 Gržeča Vas
 Gunte
 Hrastek
 Ivandol
 Jelenik
 Jelše
 Jelševec
 Kalce
 Kalce–Naklo
 Kališovec
 Kerinov Grm
 Kobile
 Kočno
 Koprivnica
 Koritnica
 Kostanjek
 Kremen
 Kržišče
 Leskovec pri Krškem
 Libelj
 Libna
 Loke
 Lokve
 Lomno
 Mali Kamen
 Mali Koren
 Mali Podlog
 Mali Trn
 Malo Mraševo
 Mikote
 Mladje
 Mrčna Sela
 Mrtvice
 Nemška Gora
 Nemška Vas
 Nova Gora
 Osredek pri Trški Gori
 Pesje
 Pijana Gora
 Planina pri Raki
 Planina v Podbočju
 Pleterje
 Podbočje
 Podlipa
 Podulce
 Površje
 Premagovce
 Presladol
 Pristava ob Krki
 Pristava pod Rako
 Pristava pri Leskovcu
 Prušnja Vas
 Raka
 Ravne pri Zdolah
 Ravni
 Ravno
 Raztez
 Reštanj
 Rožno
 Šedem
 Sela pri Raki
 Selce pri Leskovcu
 Selo
 Senovo
 Senožete
 Senuše
 Slivje
 Smečice
 Smednik
 Spodnja Libna
 Spodnje Dule
 Spodnje Pijavško
 Spodnji Stari Grad
 Srednje Arto
 Srednje Pijavško
 Sremič
 Stari Grad
 Stari Grad v Podbočju
 Stolovnik
 Stranje
 Straža pri Krškem
 Straža pri Raki
 Strmo Rebro
 Šutna
 Trška Gora
 Velika Vas pri Krškem
 Veliki Dol
 Veliki Kamen
 Veliki Koren
 Veliki Podlog
 Veliki Trn
 Veliko Mraševo
 Veniše
 Videm
 Vihre
 Volovnik
 Vrbina
 Vrh pri Površju
 Vrhulje
 Žabjek v Podbočju
 Zabukovje pri Raki
 Žadovinek
 Zaloke
 Zdole
 Ženje

See also
 Speedway Grand Prix of Slovenia
 Brežice

References

External links

 City Municipality of Krško on Geopedia
 Krško municipal website 

 
Krsko